Forever in My Heart is a Philippine television drama romance series broadcast by GMA Network. Directed by Mark Reyes and Phil Noble, it stars Regine Velasquez, Richard Gomez, Ariel Rivera and Dawn Zulueta. It premiered on September 27, 2004 on the network's Telebabad line up. The series concluded on January 7, 2005 with a total of 75 episodes.

Cast and characters

Lead cast
 Regine Velasquez as Angeline Sagrado
 Richard Gomez as Raphael Cruzado
 Dawn Zulueta as Stella Carbonel
 Ariel Rivera as Michael Bernabe

Supporting cast
 Jennylyn Mercado as Joey Almasan
 Mark Herras as Chris Sagrado
 Freddie Webb as Alvin Sagrado
 Juan Rodrigo as Roberto Bernabe
 Pinky de Leon as Maita Sagrado
 Pinky Marquez as Ella Bernabe
 Cindy Kurleto as Elaine Guanzon
 Tonton Gutierrez as Ronald Carbonel
 Katrina Halili as Janelle Bernabe
 Gabby Eigenmann as Abet Torallba
 Janelle Jamer as Bea Atentido
 Jackie Castillejo as Citas Bernabe
 Jean Saburit as Glenda Cruzado
 Andrew Schimmer as Paolo Mendez
 Maureen Larrazabal as Vicky Abrera
 Jake Cuenca as William
 Carmi Martin as Laura Guanzon
 Krista Ranillo as Gem
 Jade Lopez as Lily
 Robert Ortega as Mike

Guest cast
 Railey Valeroso as young Raphael
 JC de Vera as young Michael
 Cris Daluz as Zoilo

Accolades

References

External links
 

2004 Philippine television series debuts
2005 Philippine television series endings
Filipino-language television shows
GMA Network drama series
Philippine romance television series
Television shows set in the Philippines